Julia Woodlands Baird is an Australian journalist, broadcaster and author. She contributes to The New York Times and The Sydney Morning Herald and is a regular host of The Drum, a television news review program on the Australian Broadcasting Corporation (ABC). Her non-fiction work includes a bestselling memoir and a biography on Queen Victoria.

Early life and education
Baird was born in Sydney, the middle child of Judith (née Woodlands) and Bruce Baird, deputy leader of the New South Wales Liberal Party. Along with her brothers, her early childhood was spent in Rye, New York, while her father was Australian trade commissioner in Manhattan. After the family returned to Australia in 1980, Baird attended Ravenswood School for Girls. Her HSC results placed her in the top 20 students in NSW. Baird earned a BA degree and later a PhD in history from the University of Sydney. Her honours thesis, titled "Pigeons, Priests and Prophets: the politicisation of women in the Anglican church", examined the campaign to have women ordained in that denomination. Her doctoral thesis was on women in politics and how they are treated by mainstream media. In 2005, she was a fellow at the Kennedy School of Government at Harvard University researching the globalisation of American opinion in the lead up to the Iraq War. In 2018, the University of Divinity made Baird an honorary Doctor of Divinity for her "contribution as a public intellectual to the wider community in the area of religion".

Journalism
Baird began her career as a journalist with The Sydney Morning Herald in 1998, winning her first Walkley Award for her online coverage of the 1998 Australian federal election. By 2000, she was editor of the opinion pages. She also worked as a religious commentator for Triple J and as a freelancer for ABC Radio.

In 2006, Baird moved to the United States and became deputy editor at Newsweek in New York City, working there until it ceased print publication in 2012. She has written for The Philadelphia Inquirer and been a contributing opinion writer for The New York Times. She has written about gender and political topics, such as misogyny in Australian politics, transgender soldiers in the American military and Donald Trump's political strategy. More recently, Baird has written on religious topics, such as suffering and doubt.

Returning from the United States in 2011, she became host of the ABC radio program Sunday Profile and began presenting The Drum, a current affairs television show.

Since 2016, Baird has prepared several in-depth reports on domestic violence in Australia, especially in its connection with religious communities. Her joint reporting for the "Religion and domestic violence investigation" earned four Walkley Our Watch awards, including the Gold Our Watch, in 2018. Baird's reporting on religious minority groups includes an ongoing investigation into the experience of a middle eastern Christian family as they grieve the unexplained death of their daughter at a childcare facility.

Books
Baird is a writer of nonfiction. Her first book was Media Tarts: How the Australian Press Frames Female Politicians and was published in 2004.

In 2010, while living in Philadelphia, she began research for a biography on Queen Victoria for which she was given access to the Royal Archives in Windsor. Random House published Victoria: The Queen in 2016. It was named a book of the year by the literary critics of the New York Times.

Her third book draws on Baird's personal experience of life-threatening illness and "the things that give us comfort, that make us strong". Phosphorescence: On Awe, Wonder and Things That Sustain You When the World Goes Dark was published in Australia in March 2020. The title became a best seller soon after the COVID-19 pandemic lockdowns began. Phosphorescence was named non-fiction book of the year in the 2021 Indie Book Awards and won both the Book of the Year and the General Nonfiction Book of the Year at the 2021 Australian Book Industry Awards.

Personal life
Baird's father, Bruce Baird, was a cabinet minister in the Greiner and Fahey governments before serving in federal politics. Baird's younger brother is Mike Baird, who was the 44th Premier of New South Wales and later became CEO of a Christian aged-care charity, Hammondcare. Her younger brother, Steve, heads International Justice Mission in Australia, an anti modern slavery organisation. She has two children. Along with her parents and siblings, Baird openly identifies as a Christian. Baird has been a strong critic of conservative Christian traditions and has campaigned for the ordination of women in the Sydney diocese of the Anglican Church of Australia.

In 2015, Baird disclosed in her New York Times column that she was recovering from surgery for cancer. On 19 January 2017, her brother revealed that Baird's cancer had recurred.

Bibliography

References

External links
 

Living people
Writers from Sydney
University of Sydney alumni
Australian political journalists
The New York Times columnists
American women columnists
Australian biographers
Women biographers
21st-century biographers
21st-century Australian historians
Australian women historians
21st-century Australian women writers
20th-century Australian journalists
21st-century Australian journalists
University of Divinity alumni
The Sydney Morning Herald people
20th-century Australian women
21st-century American women
1967 births